Sebastián de Covarrubias (1539–1613) was a Spanish lexicographer, cryptographer, chaplain and writer. He wrote the Tesoro de la lengua castellana o española.

Biography and family
Sebastián de Covarrubias's father, Sebastián de Horozco, was a New Christian; his family had converted from Judaism to the Catholic Church. Covarrubias's mother, Maria Valero de Covarrubias Leyva, was from an Old Christian family of great prestige.

Covarrubias studied in Salamanca from 1565 to 1573. During that time he lived with his uncle, Juan de Covarrubias, who was a canon of the Cathedral of Salamanca. After Sebastián became a priest, the elder Covarrubias resigned his position in favor of his nephew. Thereafter, Covarrubias became chaplain to Philip II of Spain, a consultant to the Congregation for the Doctrine of the Faith, and canon of the Cuenca Cathedral.

Work
In 1610 Covarrubias became seriously ill, but he recovered and began work as an author. He published his Emblemas morales ("Moral Emblems") in 1610. He is best known, however, for his etymological dictionary, Tesoro de la lengua castellana o española (Treasury of Castilian or Spanish Language), originally published in 1611. Though Covarrubias's supplement to the Tesoro was not published during his lifetime, Spanish priest Benito Remigio Noydens produced a new edition in 1674.

References

Relevant literature
Gonzalez. 1966. Proverbs in Covarrubias' "Tesoro de la Lengua Catellana". University of Texas MA thesis.

Spanish male writers
1539 births
1613 deaths
Spanish lexicographers
Spanish cryptographers
People of Spanish-Jewish descent